Political power grows out of the barrel of a gun is a phrase which was coined by Chinese communist leader Mao Zedong. The phrase was originally used by Mao during an emergency meeting of the Chinese Communist Party (CCP) on 7 August 1927, at the beginning of the Chinese Civil War.  

Mao employed the phrase a second time on 6 November 1938, during his concluding speech at the sixth Plenary Session of the CCP's 6th Central Committee. The speech was concerned with both the Civil War and the Second Sino-Japanese War, which had commenced the previous year. 

In 1960, a portion of the 1938 speech was excerpted and included in Mao's Selected Works, with the title "Problems of War and Strategy".  However, the central phrase was popularized largely as a result of its prominence in Mao's Quotations from Chairman Mao Tse-Tung (1964).

Sixth plenary session

The 1938 paragraph containing the phrase is reproduced below; the central phrase (in bold), cited as deriving from the 1938 speech via the Selected Works, is that given in Mao's Quotations.

See also

Enemy of the people
From each according to his ability, to each according to his needs
He who does not work, neither shall he eat
List of political slogans
Monopoly on violence
No War but the Class War
Proletarians of all countries, unite!
Serve the People
Si vis pacem, para bellum
To each according to his contribution

References

External links
 Quotations from Mao Tse Tung, Mao Tse Tung Internet Archive (marxists.org)

Maoist terminology
Political catchphrases
Firearms
Political science terminology
Political violence